Jennings is a surname.

Jennings may also refer to:

Places
Australia
Jennings, New South Wales, a town

Caribbean
Jennings, Antigua and Barbuda, a small settlement

United States
Jennings, Florida, a town in Florida
Jennings County, Indiana, a county in Indiana
Jennings, Kansas, a city in northwestern Kansas
Jennings, Anne Arundel County, Maryland, an incorporated community in Maryland
Jennings, Garrett County, Maryland, an incorporated area in Maryland
Jennings, Louisiana, a city in Louisiana near Lake Charles
Jennings, Missouri, a city in Missouri near St. Louis
Jennings, Oklahoma, a town in Pawnee County, Oklahoma
Jennings, Wisconsin, an incorporated community in the town of Schoepke, Wisconsin
Jennings Creek, a stream in Ohio
Jennings Environmental Education Center, a state park in Pennsylvania

Other uses
 Jennings (novels), a series of novels
 Bryco Arms/Jennings Firearms/Jimenez Arms, a former firearms manufacturer in California
 Jennings Brewery, a brewery in Cumbria, England
 Jennings Musical Instruments
 William M. Jennings Trophy, a National Hockey League trophy
 Jennings, a steam engine character from Thomas the Tank Engine creator Wilbert Awdry, which was never featured in The Railway Series but was part of a layout for the Mid Sodor Railway